Duško Sikirica (born 23 March 1964, Čirkin Polje, Prijedor, Bosnia and Herzegovina, Yugoslavia) is a Bosnian Serb who was charged with genocide, crimes against humanity, and violations of the customs of war by the International Criminal Tribunal for the Former Yugoslavia (ICTY) for his actions as the commander of the Keraterm camp.

He was transferred to the ICTY on 25 June 2000. He was tried along with Damir Došen and Dragan Kolundžija. Sikirica originally pleaded not guilty to all charges. Later, as part of a plea deal, he pleaded guilty to one charge of persecutions as a crime against humanity. He was sentenced to fifteen years in jail on 13 November 2001. From 2002 on he served his jail time in Austria. On 21 June 2010 he was released.

See also
Bosnian War
International Criminal Tribunal for the Former Yugoslavia

References
 ICTY Case Information Sheet
 ICTY Amended Indictment

Army of Republika Srpska soldiers
1964 births
Living people
People from Prijedor
People convicted by the International Criminal Tribunal for the former Yugoslavia
Bosnia and Herzegovina people imprisoned abroad
Prisoners and detainees of Austria
Serbs of Bosnia and Herzegovina convicted of crimes against humanity
Serbs of Bosnia and Herzegovina